Nitrosyl cyanide, a blue-green gas, is the compound with the molecular formula ONCN. The compound has been invoked as a product of the oxidation of cyanamide catalyzed by the enzyme glucose oxidase.

Structure, synthesis, reactivity
The structure of nitrosyl cyanide is planar. It is strongly bent at the internal nitrogen, analogous to the structure of nitrosyl chloride. The C-N-O angle is 113°. The NCN angle is 170°.

The compound can be created by the reaction of nitrosyl chloride and silver cyanide at low temperatures.  It is not typically isolated, but trapped by Diels-Alder reactions, e.g. with butadiene. Cycloadditions occur across the N=O bond. It forms a reversible adduct with 9,10-dimethylantracene.

Related compound
 Nitryl cyanide (O2NCN), a colorless gas (b.p. 7 °C).

References

Cyanide
Nitrogen(III) compounds
Gases with color